Oued Taga is a town in north-eastern Algeria.

History

Geography

Berbaga Cascades
The Cascades de Berbaga are located in a mountainous area difficult to reach by car in the commune of Oued Taga in the wilaya of Batna a few kilometers from Timgad]].

Population

Pictures from Oued Taga

References

External links 

Communes of Batna Province
Cities in Algeria